Stefan van der Lei (born 5 March 1993) is a Dutch professional footballer who plays as a goalkeeper for VV Pelikaan-S.

Career
In 2018, Van der Lei played for Dalkurd FF in Sweden.

References

External links
 

1993 births
Living people
Dutch footballers
Netherlands under-21 international footballers
FC Groningen players
FC Emmen players
Willem II (football club) players
Dalkurd FF players
Eredivisie players
Eerste Divisie players
Allsvenskan players
Association football goalkeepers
Footballers from Groningen (city)
Dutch expatriate footballers
Dutch expatriate sportspeople in Sweden
Expatriate footballers in Sweden